The Denver Aviators was a 2007 expansion member of the National Indoor Football League (NIFL).  They play their home games at the Denver Coliseum in Denver, Colorado.  In their first game, they had a large defeat at Wyoming Cavalry.  Their second game was moved to an outdoor game the day of the game, becoming the only NIFL game played outdoors.  This game is believed to be the cause of the league collapsing as Wyoming Cavalry showed up for the second game but couldn't play due to not having proper shoes for outdoor surface.  The Monday after the game, the 9 independent team owners agreed to leave the league for the rest of the season.

Season-by-season 

|-
|2007 || 1 || 1 || 0 || 2nd Pacific Northern || --

External links
Official website

National Indoor Football League teams
American football teams in Denver